Zhodzinskiya Naviny (Жодзінскія Навіны; Zhodino News)  is a newspaper published in Zhodzina, Belarus.

Bilingual newspapers
Russian-language newspapers published in Belarus
Mass media in Zhodzina